M160 may refer to:

M-160 (Michigan highway), a state highway in Michigan
M-160 mortar, a Soviet heavy mortar
Mercedes-Benz M160 engine, an automobile engine
M160, a version of the 7.62×51mm NATO rifle cartridge
Ecofly M160, a German aircraft engine
Beyerdynamic M 160, a German ribbon microphone introduced in 1957